Peter Wishart (born 18 June 1937) is an Australian cricketer. He played 26 first-class matches for Western Australia between 1959/60 and 1964/65.

References

External links
 

1937 births
Living people
Australian cricketers
Western Australia cricketers
Cricketers from Perth, Western Australia